The list of ship launches in 1751 includes a chronological list of some ships launched in 1751.


References

1751
Ship launches